This is a list of museums in Trinidad and Tobago.

 Angostura Museum & the Barcant Butterfly Collection
 Indian Caribbean Museum of Trinidad and Tobago
 Luise Kimme's Museum
 Moruga Museum
 Museum of Tobago History
 National Museum and Art Gallery, Port of Spain
 Toco Folk Museum
 Chagaraumas Military Museum

The Museum of the City of Port of Spain — at Fort San Andrés on South Quay, Port of Spain.
Museum of the Police Service of Trinidad and Tobago — at Police Headquarters, St Vincent Street, Port of Spain.
Money Museum — in the Central Bank at Eric Williams Financial Plaza, Independence Square, Port of Spain.

See also 
 List of museums by country

External links 
 http://www.tntisland.com/gallery.html

Trinidad and Tobago
 
Trinidad and Tobago
Trinidad and Tobago
Museums
Museums
Museums